Trinity Episcopal Church is a historic church located at 650 Rahway Avenue in Woodbridge Township of Middlesex County, New Jersey. The third church at this location, it was added to the National Register of Historic Places on May 12, 2004, for its significance in architecture and religion.

History
The congregation became active on December 29, 1703, and the first church was erected about 1717. The second church, erected on the same site in 1754, was granted a charter by King George III on December 6, 1769. It was destroyed by fire in 1858. The cornerstone of the present church was laid on July 7, 1860. The building was consecrated May 20, 1861.

The church remains active today, with regular services, as well as community involvement, including hosting Alcoholics Anonymous meetings and running a food pantry.

Description
The church was designed by Newark architect C. Harrison Condit in the Gothic Revival style often used by architect Richard Upjohn. It is a one-story brick building laid out in a cruciform plan with a slender bell-cot and features a steeply pitched, gable, slate roof.

St. Martha's House, formerly known as the Sexton House, and the rectory, known as the Jonathan Singletary Dunham House, also contribute to this NRHP listing. The Dunham House features elaborate Flemish checker brickwork.

Cemetery

The churchyard contains a cemetery with graves and tombstones dating back to 1715.

See also
 National Register of Historic Places listings in Middlesex County, New Jersey
 Jonathan Singletary Dunham House – Rectory
 First Presbyterian Church and Cemetery – adjacent church, at 600 Rahway Avenue

References

External links
 
 
 

Episcopal church buildings in New Jersey
Churches on the National Register of Historic Places in New Jersey
Gothic Revival church buildings in New Jersey
Colonial Revival architecture in New Jersey
Churches completed in 1861
Churches in Middlesex County, New Jersey
Churches in Woodbridge Township, New Jersey
National Register of Historic Places in Middlesex County, New Jersey
New Jersey Register of Historic Places
19th-century Episcopal church buildings
1703 establishments in New Jersey
Cemeteries in Middlesex County, New Jersey
Religious organizations established in 1703
Brick buildings and structures